These are the official results of the Men's 4x100 metres event at the 1982 European Championships in Athens, Greece. The final was held at Olympic Stadium "Spiros Louis" on 11 September 1982.

Medalists

Final

Participation
According to an unofficial count, 32 athletes from 8 countries participated in the event.

 (4)
 (4)
 (4)
 (4)
 (4)
 (4)
 (4)
 (4)

See also
 1978 Men's European Championships 4 × 100 m Relay (Prague)
 1980 Men's Olympic 4 × 100 m Relay (Moscow)
 1983 Men's World Championships 4 × 100 m Relay (Helsinki)
 1984 Men's Olympic 4 × 100 m Relay (Los Angeles)
 1986 Men's European Championships 4 × 100 m Relay (Stuttgart)
 1987 Men's World Championships 4 × 100 m Relay (Rome)
 1988 Men's Olympic 4 × 100 m Relay (Seoul)
 1990 Men's European Championships 4 × 100 m Relay (Split)

References

 Results

4 x 100 metres relay
Relays at the European Athletics Championships